Christmas calendar may refer to:

 The Christmas Calendar (2017 film), a Canadian made-for-TV film directed by Allan Harmon and starring Laura Bell Bundy
 A Christmas Calendar, a 1987 PBS holiday special hosted by Loretta Swit
 Advent calendar, a special calendar used to count the days of Advent
 Nordic Christmas calendar, a form of televised advent calendars in the Nordic countries

See also:
 The Holiday Calendar, a 2018 Netflix-premiered film directed by Bradley Walsh and starring Kat Graham